

Lists of Ambassadors

Minister Jeonathan Prato 1960 - 1963
Minister Yossef Keisari (Non-Resident, Mexico City), 1954 - 1956

References

Cuba
Israel